K. Parthasarathi was an Indian politician of the Indian National Congress and Member of the Legislative Assembly of Madras state. He served as the Deputy Speaker of the Madras Legislative Assembly from 1962 to 1967.

Notes 

Indian National Congress politicians from Tamil Nadu
Possibly living people
Deputy Speakers of the Tamil Nadu Legislative Assembly
Year of birth missing
Year of death missing